Chabbert is a surname. Notable people with the surname include:

Jean Chabbert (1920–2016), French prelate of the Roman Catholic Church
Sébastien Chabbert (born 1978), French football player

See also
Chabert